The Royal Palace of Almeirim was a royal residence of the Portuguese royal family in Almeirim, Portugal. It was constructed in the Middle Ages and expanded in the 16th century. It was a favoured residence to spend the winter times, contrary to Sintra in the summer. After being heavily damaged by the 1755 Lisbon earthquake, it has been demolished in the 19th century.

History
Almeirim is located close to Tagus river, offering easy access to Lisbon. Also, it has rich hunting grounds. For the kings of the Aviz Dynasty and their court, the palace became a favourite residence to spend their winter time. The palace received the nickname the 'Sintra of Winter'.

Between 1411 and 1423, the first (castellated) palace was constructed on orders of the first Aviz king John I (1357-1433). King Manuel I (1469-1521) expanded the palace. It became a large complex with next to the palace buildings a royal chapel, stables, vast vegetable gardens and pleasure gardens (which included a labyrinth in the 17th century). The width of the palace was more or less 100 meters, similar to the Ducal Palace of Vila Viçosa. The king spent long periods in Almeirim (e.g. almost the full year of 1510, part of 1513, Christmas 1514, and the months between October 1515 and May 1516). His successor, John III followed his example.

The palace was the scene of pompous parties and weddings, such as between Isabella of Portugal and her cousin Charles V, Holy Roman Emperor, King of Spain, Archduke of Austria, and Duke of Burgundy.
Cardinal-King Henry (1512-1580) died at the palace of Almeirim on 31 January 1580, his 68th birthday. As there was no appointed successor, a war for succession started. In the end, Philip II of Spain (1527-1598) became the new king. Although, he did not inhabit the palace, he still spent large amounts to renovate the palace of his mother's dynasty.

Portuguese Restoration War established the House of Braganza as the new royal family and also brought new life to the palace. Especially king Peter II (1648-1706), who was fund of hunting, spent his time here.
The 1755 Lisbon earthquake seriously damaged the palace. It was almost in ruins and cannot be inhabited any more. Afterwards, it not renovated or restored. In 1792, the latter John VI, as regent for Queen Maria I, ordered the demolition of the palace, which only happened in the 19th century, with the last wall being demolished in 1891.

Modern times
Today, nothing remains of the royal palaces of Almeirim. In memory of the palace, the municipality of Almeirim is considering to restore the portico of the royal palace in the garden of the Republic.

The palace contained a marble fireplace, which was once given to King Manuel by Pope Leo X in 1515. In 1898, it was transferred to the National Palace in Sintra and installed in the Magpies room (Sala das Pegas), where it still can be admired.

Paço dos Negros da Ribeira de Muge
In 1512, King Manuel I constructed a second palace which was located a few kilometres from Almeirim, called the Paço dos Negros da Ribeira de Muge. ‘Negros’ in the name of the palace refers to the black slaves who lived at the palace. The palace served as a secluded hunting lodge.

Modern times
Today, only a portico in Manueline style remains of the Paço dos Negros.

References

Literature

External links
 

Palaces in Portugal
Royal residences in Portugal
Former buildings and structures in Portugal
Demolished buildings and structures in Portugal
Former palaces
Almeirim